Events from the year 1796 in Canada.

Incumbents
Monarch: George III

Federal government
Parliament of Lower Canada: 1st (until May 31)
Parliament of Upper Canada: 1st (until June 3)

Governors
Governor of the Canadas: Guy Carleton, 1st Baron Dorchester
Governor of New Brunswick: Thomas Carleton
Governor of Nova Scotia: John Wentworth
Commodore-Governor of Newfoundland: John Elliot
Governor of St. John's Island: Edmund Fanning
Governor of Upper Canada: John Graves Simcoe

Events
About 600 Blacks from Jamaica are deported to Nova Scotia. Known as Maroons, they help rebuild the Halifax Citadel. In 1800, most of them leave for Sierra Leone, Africa.
York officially becomes the capital of Upper Canada.
American David McLane, being convicted of high treason, is hanged on a gibbet on the glacis of the fortifications at Quebec. (Note – possibly 1797)

Births

March 10 – Julia Catherine Beckwith, author (d.1867)
May 5 – Robert Foulis, inventor, civil engineer and artist (d.1866)
May 8 – Jean-Baptiste Meilleur, doctor, educator and politician (d.1878)
June – Thomas Brown Anderson, merchant, banker and politician (d.1873)
December 17 – Thomas Chandler Haliburton, author, judge and politician (d.1865)

Full date unknown
 John Redpath, Scots-Quebecer businessman and philanthropist, Born in Earlston, Scottish Borders, Scotland. (d.1869)

Deaths
 July 10 – Joseph Fairbanks, merchant and political figure in Nova Scotia. (b. 1718)

References 

 
Canada
96